Alafia caudata is a plant in the family Apocynaceae.

Description
Alafia caudata grows as a climbing shrub or liana. Its fragrant flowers feature a white or yellowish corolla.

Distribution and habitat
Alafia caudata is native to an area of tropical Africa from Cameroon to Mozambique. Its habitat is mixed forest.

References

caudata
Plants described in 1894
Flora of West-Central Tropical Africa
Flora of East Tropical Africa
Flora of South Tropical Africa